Sex to Sexty was a sexually-oriented humor magazine published in Arlington, Texas, by John W. Newbern, Jr. and Peggy Rodebaugh, with art direction (and cartoons, covers, etc.) by Lowell Davis (later to become known as a creator of bucolic art)), under the respective pseudonyms of Richard or Dick Rodman, Goose Reardon, and Pierre Davis.

The content was a mixture of risqué anecdotes; limericks (some by Gershon Legman) and other short humorous sexual poetry; and cartoons, the latter initially by Davis but soon expanding to include artists such as veteran good girl artists Bill Ward and Bill Wenzel. It ran from 1964 to 1983.

The company which published the magazine also published novelty records and paperback books under the Sex to Sexty title.

Critical reception 
The first serious discussion of the magazine was published by Taschen in 2008, titled, Sex to Sexty: The Most Vulgar Magazine Ever Made!  edited by Dian Hanson, with a preface by artist Mike Kelley.

References

20th century in Arlington, Texas
1964 establishments in Texas
1983 disestablishments in Texas
Satirical magazines published in the United States
Culture of Arlington, Texas
Defunct magazines published in the United States
Humor magazines
Magazines established in 1964
Magazines disestablished in 1983
Magazines published in Texas